Samson Baidoo (born 31 March 2004) is an Austrian professional footballer who plays as a defender for Austrian Bundesliga club Red Bull Salzburg and its farm-club Liefering.

International career
Born in Austria, Baidoo is of Ghanaian descent. He is a youth international for Austria.

Career statistics

Club

Notes

References

2004 births
Living people
Austrian footballers
Austria youth international footballers
Austrian people of Ghanaian descent
Association football defenders
2. Liga (Austria) players
Austrian Football Bundesliga players
Grazer AK players
FC Red Bull Salzburg players
FC Liefering players